The second Khaleda cabinet was the Government of Bangladesh during the 8th legislative session of the Jatiya Sangsad following the 2001 general election. The cabinet took office on 10 October 2001 and left office on 29 October 2006. The Prime Minister and head of the government was Khaleda Zia.

Ministers

State Ministers

Deputy Ministers 
The following table is the list of Deputy Ministers.

Shuffles
 14 November 2001
 Morshed Khan became the minister of the foreign affairs.
 11 March 2002
 Tariqul Islam was transferred from the food ministry to the information ministry.
 Abdul Moyeen Khan was transferred from the information ministry to the ministry of science and ICT.
 Abdullah Al Noman was transferred from the labour and employment ministry to the food ministry.
 Lutfor Rahman Khan Azad became the state minister of labour and employment.
 22 May 2003
 Seven ministers were removed: 
 Water Resources Minister L. K. Siddiqi
 Fisheries and Livestock Minister Sadeque Hossain Khoka, 
 Minister without Portfolio Harunur Rashid Khan Monno
 State Minister for Liberation War Affairs Redwan Ahmed
 State Minister for Commerce Barkat Ullah Bulu
 State Minister for Disaster Management and Relief Ebadur Rahman Chowdhury
 State Minister for Post and Telecommunication Ehsanul Haque Mollah.
 The 60-member cabinet downsized to 53.
 25 March 2004
 Amir Khasru Mahmud Chowdhury is removed from the commerce minister position.
 Reaz Rahman is removed from the state minister for foreign affairs position.
 Altaf Hossain Chowdhury was transferred from the home affairs ministry to the commerce ministry.
 6 May 2004
 The ministries of jute and textiles merged into the Ministry of Textiles and Jute.
 The ministries of food and disaster management and relief ministries merged to form the Ministry of Food and Disaster Management.
 Abdul Matin Chowdhury was removed from the textiles ministry.
 Tariqul Islam was transferred from information ministry to the environment and forest ministry.
 M Shamsul Islam was transferred from the land ministry to the information ministry.
 Chowdhury Kamal Ibne Yusuf was transferred from disaster management and relief to the food and disaster management ministry.
 Abdullah Al Noman was transferred from the food ministry to the fisheries and livestock ministry. 
 Shajahan Siraj was transferred from the environment and forest ministry to the textiles and jute ministry.
 Lutfor Rahman Khan Azad was transferred from the state ministry of jute to the NGO affairs ministry.
 Abdus Sattar Bhuiyan was transferred from the state ministry of the fisheries and livestock to the state ministry of land.
 18 June 2005
 A. K. M. Mosharraf Hossain resigned from the position of State Minister for Energy.
 24 April 2006
 Altaf Hossain Chowdhury was removed from commerce ministry.
 Hafizuddin Ahmed took charge of commerce ministry along with the water resource ministry.
 15 May 2006
 Alamgir Kabir was moved from being the state minister of housing and public works to the  state minister for woman and children affairs.
 20 May 2006
 Former state minister for power Iqbal Hasan Mahmud Tuku became the state minister of the agriculture.
 Former state minister for finance and planning Anwarul Kabir Talukdar became the state minister for power.
 9 July 2006
 Lutfor Rahman Khan Azad was transferred from the state minister of NGO affairs position to the expatriates welfare and overseas employment.
 Mohammad Quamrul Islam was transferred from the state minister of expatriates welfare and overseas employment position to the state minister for shipping position.
 29 September 2006
 State minister for power Anwarul Kabir Talukdar was removed from the post.
 4 October 2006
 Abdus Sattar Bhuiyan became the state minister of power, along with being the state minister of land.

References

Political history of Bangladesh
Cabinets established in 2001
Cabinets disestablished in 2006
Khaleda Zia ministries